Hale School is an independent, Anglican day and boarding school for boys, located in Wembley Downs, a western suburb of Perth, Western Australia.

Named after the school founded by Bishop Mathew Blagden Hale in 1858, Hale School claims to be the oldest private boys' school in Western Australia, a claim subsequently contested by historian and former Hale School Headmaster Dr Ken Tregonning. The school was originally situated at the Cloisters on St Georges Terrace in Perth, relocated to the Pensioner Guard Barracks at the top of St George's Terrace around 1880, and then to new Havelock Street premises in 1914 in West Perth. In 1961 the School moved to its current premises in Wembley Downs. The campus now consists of a junior school for Years Pre-Primary to 6, a middle school for Years 7 & 8 and a senior school for Year 9 to 12. The school also consists of sporting grounds, and boarding facilities for regional and international students.

The school is a member of the Public Schools Association and the Junior School Heads Association of Australia.

Hale's sister school is St Mary's Anglican Girls' School located in Karrinyup, a nearby suburb.

In 2008, Hale School celebrated its sesquicentennial (150th) anniversary.

History 

Part of Australia's colonial history, Hale School claims to be the first high school in Western Australia, and the school educated many prominent sons of the Swan River Colony. The school was originally known as Boys High School and the inaugural chairman was Archibald Paull Burt, a notable jurist and slaveholder (in the West Indies).

Modelled on England's prestigious public schools, it has sometimes been accused of being elitist. For example, in his biography of Sir John Forrest, Frank Crowley described the school's values throughout the 1870s as "a heady compound of social snobbery, laissez-faire capitalism, sentimental royalism, patriotic Anglicanism, benevolent imperialism and racial superiority".

In contemporary social commentary, for example Professor Mark Peel's study of class and schooling in Australia, Hale School was identified as one of the most rigorous and selective schools for boys. In recent times equity concerns have been addressed by a scholarship program, including the first full boarding scholarships in Western Australia for Indigenous students.

The school was initially known as "Bishop Hale's Collegiate School", and later as "The High School". It has since been renamed "Hale School" in honour of its founder, and reconstituted under the Hale School Act (1876) of the Parliament of Western Australia.

Controversy
According to Edith Cowan, Western Australia's first female member of Parliament, the Act that evolved out Bishop Hale's School - the Church of England Collegiate School Act - co-existed with a public secular school instantiated under its own Act - the High School Act, creating two independent and theologically opposed legal entities. The latter then misappropriated the name "Hale School", the commencement date 1858 and other paraphernalia, about which Cowan laments:

"It is only those of us who remember Bishop Hale personally and his deeply spiritual and religious type of mind (yet broad and tolerant of the views of others) who can realise the travesty of giving his name to an institution whose foundations are so unmistakably opposite to the principles he invariably upheld. Can it be wondered at that the Diocesan Council takes exception, as do other members of the Church of England, to the present High or Hale School’s use of the old Bishop Hale’s School badge, to the foundation date on its new buildings and the incorrect statement that Bishop Hale founded the High School."

Locations
Bishop Hale's Collegiate School was designed by Richard Roach Jewell in 1858 and is situated on St Georges Terrace. The buildings eventually became known as The Cloisters. In 1914, the School moved to a more spacious site at Havelock Street, West Perth, opposite the Parliament of Western Australia. Finally, in 1961, the school relocated to its current  premises in Wembley Downs.

Headmasters

Campus 

Hale School's campus is a 48-hectare site located in Wembley Downs. The administration building, Memorial Hall (including the redfoot youth theatre), Tom Hoar Dining Hall, Stowe Drama Centre, Forrest Library, Chapel of St Mark, cafeteria, clothing store, IT department and Old Haleians' Boardroom are all located on the south west corner of the campus near the main entrance.

The Peter Wright Technology Building, which houses the Design and Technology Workshop as well as Computer and Design Suites sits adjacent to the Doug Poake Pool. Also adjacent to the swimming pool is the art complex, gymnasium and change-rooms.

The John Inverarity Music and Drama Centre is located on the western side of the campus facing Unwin Avenue. This building separates the Senior School from the Junior School which is located on the north west corner of the campus, along with the junior boarding residence, Brine House. The senior boarding house is located on the eastern side of the campus while the sports playing fields occupy the north east.

Forrest Library 

The new Teaching and Learning precinct on the site of the old boarding houses near the south entrance to the campus was officially opened on 1 July 2009. The main feature of this project, a new Library Resource Centre includes a dedicated Year 12 study area and Gifted and Talented and Curriculum Support rooms facing a central courtyard. Beneath the library is a new clothing store, IT department and Old Haleians' Boardroom.

While the library was open for student use from February 2009 school year, the official opening ceremony was not held until 1 July 2009, when it was officially opened by Andrew Forrest and unveiled as the Forrest Library. It honours members of the Forrest family, from Sir John Forrest to Alexander Forrest, and on to Andrew Forrest himself, who had been educated at Hale.

Also included in this precinct is a new cafeteria with internal and external seating opposite the library and a new Teaching and Learning building. The classroom block ('F-block') consists of 17 teaching spaces for History, English and languages, as well as two language oral work rooms and new office space for teaching staff. Another important feature is a set-down and pick-up road that runs from a new 50-bay carpark adjacent to the chapel, along the front of the classroom block, past the Library undercroft, before rejoining the main drive.

In 2010 the Australian Institute of Architects awarded the Forrest Library an Architecture Award for Public Architecture.

John Inverarity Music and Drama Centre 

The John Inverarity Music and Drama Centre comprises a large auditorium/theatre, backstage holding rooms, two main rehearsal studios, percussion and string studios, two large music teaching rooms and 19 music practice rooms. It was first opened for use in January 2001.

The centrepiece of the complex is the timber-lined recital auditorium which accommodates 353 patrons on stepped tiers with a flat performance area 17 m wide and 12 m deep. The auditorium design has been dictated by the requirements to have natural acoustics for music. This has been achieved through the use of a traditional 'rectangular box' design with a maximum ceiling height of 8 m. The auditorium can be tuned for different instruments and various music/drama performances to achieve desired acoustic qualities. This is accomplished by a system of moveable full-height wall reflectors, suspended ceiling reflectors and rotating wall panels with differing degrees of absorptive linings. The ceiling loft is mechanised with 27 variable speed automatic winch lines which give a great degree of flexibility for a range of shows.

Middle school 

The construction of a new Middle School facility commenced in January 2009 and was completed in January 2010. The Middle School site is located adjacent to Unwin Avenue, between the John Inverarity Music and Drama Centre and the Memorial Hall. The building contains 16 classrooms for Year 7 and 8 students. The Year 8 Classrooms are on the ground floor and the Year 7 Classrooms are on the first floor. The main entrance, reception & administration offices for the Head of Middle School, Deputy Head, Head of Curriculum & Head of Pastoral Care are located on a separate intermediate level, which is at street level with Unwin Avenue. Other staff facilities are located on the ground floor. In addition, the facility incorporates one of the School's existing buildings ('L-block' classrooms) which were refurbished as music, drama and science classrooms for the Middle School. The ground level of this building was refurbished as a Middle School Science Classroom (and store room), with the upper level refitted to house a Drama classroom, Music classroom (with store room) & 4 music practice rooms.

The refurbishment of this building commenced in October 2009 but was not completed in time for the commencement of the school year in February 2010. The new building replaced the 'C-block' classrooms and Senior School Library that previously occupied the site and were demolished in December 2008.

Junior School 
The Hale Junior school was originally built when the Wembley Downs campus was opened. Today, it has classes from Pre - Primary up to Year 6, with around 400 students enrolled. It was demolished in 2017 to give way to an award - winning new campus. Some awards include 'Architecture Award for Education Architecture, Western Australia 2019' and 'Learning Environments WA Chapter, Category 2: New Construction / New Individual Facility over $8m'. It features a modern design with the year groups split up into a 'Lower Junior' (PP to Year 2), 'Middle Junior' (Year 3 and Year 4) and 'Upper Junior' (Year 5 and Year 6). All buildings have open areas, called 'breakout spaces', where students can work together in small groups or presentations can be held.

Sporting facilities 

Hale School campus includes various sporting facilities, including:
 an eight lane 25-metre heated swimming pool
 a ten lane 50-metre heated swimming pool
 a gymnasium, with basketball, badminton, volleyball, squash and rock climbing facilities
 weights room
 rowing ergo room
 16 tennis courts: 12 plexipave, 4 grass
 4 football fields
 4 plexipave outdoor basketball courts
 5 cricket ovals with turf wickets
 32 cricket practice wickets: both synthetic and turf
 4 soccer fields
 cross country tracks
 2 rugby fields
 track and field facilities
 aquaturf surface hockey field with clubrooms
 3 additional grass hockey ovals
 a rowing fleet housed at Cygnet Hall on the Swan River (off campus)

In 1885, the school entered a team into the West Australian Football Association (WAFA) for its inaugural season, but were forced to withdraw two rounds into the season due to a lack of players.

Hale School has hosted important teams over the years, including the English Rugby Team on occasions, namely for training during the 2003 Rugby World Cup. The school hosted the English Cricket Academy, including international cricketers Michael Vaughan, Owais Shah, Stuart Broad, Rikki Clarke and Jon Lewis for nets sessions and practice matches, as seen on the front page of The West Australian on 29 November 2006.

House system 
There are currently 10 houses in Hale Middle/Senior School. These include 8-day houses, and 2 boarding houses:
 Buntine – red (named after former headmaster MA Buntine)
 Faulkner (boarding) – light green (named after former headmaster FC Faulkner)
 Havelock – black and yellow striped
 Haynes (named after former teacher Paddy Haynes) – yellow
 Loton – orange and navy blue
 Parry – navy blue (named after the Parry family who made a large donation to the school)
 Riley – dark green
 Meade (formerly St Georges) – red and white (named after former headmaster SG Meade)
 Tregonning – maroon (named after former headmaster KG Tregonning)
 Wilson (boarding) – blue (named after former headmaster MA Wilson)

Loton was changed from a boarding house to a day house in 2005, following the completion of the new boarding house. Prior to this Loton's colour was brown.
Year 7 & 8 boarders are housed in Brine House, which is located between the Junior School and the Music and Drama Centre, they are however also members of either Faulkner or Wilson houses.

There are also 4 houses in Hale Junior School, named after Rhodes Scholars:
 Davy – Dark green
 Turnbull – Blue
 Rosier – Yellow
 Walker – Red

Academic standing
Since 2000, Hale School has won five of the Beazley Medals, awarded to the student obtaining the highest marks in the state administered tertiary entrance examinations.

The school appears regularly in the top 10 schools for the Western Australian Certificate of Education rankings.

Sport 
Hale is a member of the Public Schools Association (PSA).

PSA premierships 
Hale has won the following PSA premierships.

 Athletics (14) - 1920, 1921, 1922, 1923, 1924, 1925, 1928, 1934, 1939, 1941, 1992, 2001, 2002, 2017
 Badminton (4) - 2005, 2007, 2008, 2019
 Basketball (10) - 1984, 1985, 1986, 1987, 1988, 1989, 1994, 1995, 2008, 2017
 Cricket (28) - 1905, 1906, 1907, 1909, 1911, 1916, 1922, 1925, 1933, 1934, 1938, 1947, 1948, 1950, 1956, 1961, 1966, 1967, 1976, 1992, 1995, 1999, 2000, 2001, 2002, 2009, 2011, 2019
 Football (22) - 1921, 1939, 1941, 1947, 1966, 1973, 1978, 1984, 1985, 1989, 1995, 1996, 1999, 2001, 2003, 2009, 2010, 2012, 2014, 2016, 2017, 2019
 Golf (6) - 2004, 2006, 2007, 2010, 2013, 2015
 Hockey (5) - 1980, 1990, 2012, 2014, 2019
 Rowing (2) - 2000, 2001
 Rugby (24) - 1964, 1965, 1969, 1971, 1974, 1975, 1977, 1980, 1982, 1999, 2001, 2003, 2004, 2005, 2006, 2007, 2008, 2009, 2010, 2011, 2012, 2013, 2014, 2015
 Soccer (10) - 1993, 1997, 1998, 1999, 2004, 2005, 2006, 2010, 2018, 2019
 Surfing (3) - 2006, 2016, 2017
 Swimming (40) - 1919, 1923, 1925, 1926, 1931, 1932, 1933, 1934, 1935, 1936, 1937, 1944, 1965, 1967, 1968, 1969, 1970, 1971, 1972, 1973, 1974, 1975, 1976, 1977, 1978, 1979, 1980, 1981, 1982, 1983, 1984, 1986, 1991, 1992, 1998, 2003, 2013, 2014, 2015, 2016
 Tennis (18) - 1965, 1966, 1968, 1971, 1972, 1973, 1976, 1977, 1985, 1986, 1997, 1998, 1999, 2003, 2004, 2005, 2006, 2014
 Volleyball (3) - 2019, 2021, 2022
 Water Polo (4) - 1997, 2008, 2014, 2015

Publications 
Hale School's main publication is the school's official book, The Cygnet, which is released at the start of each year and includes about 250 pages of the previous year's major happenings, school photos and sports results. The school also publishes an alumni magazine, The Haleian, twice a year, usually around June and November.

History of the School: W. J. Edgar (2008), From Slate to Cyberspace (Hale School, 150 years), Hale School, Wembley Downs, Western Australia
Book: W. J. Edgar (1994), From Veldt to Vietnam, Haleians at War, Old Haleians' Association, Wembley Downs, Western Australia

Hale School and the Australian Defence Force 
Former students have served in all conflicts since the Boer War with many having distinguished military careers.

Corporal Ben Roberts-Smith, Hale Class of 1995, son of Major General Len Roberts-Smith, is currently Australia's most decorated soldier, having been awarded the Victoria Cross and Medal for Gallantry.

One hundred and twenty four Old Haleians have died in conflicts since the Boer War. A Memorial Grove at the School site, honours these men with 124 plaques and a sculpture with an "eternal flame" theme. The great hall of the School has also been named Memorial Hall. The Hale School Museum contains important military and civilian records relating to the School and the state of Western Australia. A small Museum display is also located at the Old Hale School, now the Constitutional Centre of Western Australia, on Havelock Street, West Perth.

Image gallery

Notable alumni 

An alumnus of Hale School is called an Old Haleian. Notable Old Haleians include:

 Hugo Armstrong – flying ace of the Second World War
 Christian de Vietri – artist
 Matthew Ebden – professional tennis player
 Andrew Forrest – entrepreneur
 Sir John Forrest – first premier of Western Australia
 Michael Gardiner – AFL football player
 Lang Hancock – businessman
 Robert Juniper – painter
 Robert Drewe – author
 Matthew Lutton – theatre and opera director
 Geoff Marsh – cricket player and coach
 Sir Stephen Parker – Chief Justice of Western Australia
 Todd Pearson – Olympic swimming medallist
 Benjamin Roberts-Smith VC – Victoria Cross recipient
 Sam Roberts-Smith, operatic baritone
 Paul Royle – World War II pilot and Stalag Luft III Great Escaper
 Sharafuddin Idris Shah – Sultan of Selangor, Malaysia
 Rolly Tasker – sailor
 Tunku Ismail Idris – Crown Prince of Johor
 Melvin Poh - entrepreneur
 Peter Wright – mining magnate
 Dane Haylett-Petty – rugby union player
 Ross Haylett-Petty – rugby union player
 Justin Turner – rugby union player
 Ryan Hodson – rugby union player
 Luke Burton – rugby union player
 Nick Jooste – rugby union player
 Edward Russell - television presenter
 Marcus Stoinis – cricketer
 Christian Porter – state and federal politician
 Daryl Mitchell – Cricketer (New Zealand Blackcap)
 David Irvine (diplomat) – Head of ASIS 2003–09, Head of ASIO 2009–14
 Tom Mitchell, plays AFL football for Hawthorn, 2018 Brownlow Medallist
 Shane McAdam – AFL Footballer
 Kyron Hayden – AFL Footballer
 Mitch Georgiades – AFL Footballer
 Jy Farrar – AFL Footballer
 Darcy Cameron – AFL Footballer
 Meyne Wyatt (Actor, Writer)
 Basil Zempilas – Lord Mayor of Perth

See also 

 List of schools in the Perth metropolitan area
 List of boarding schools in Australia
 List of Anglican schools in Australia

References

External links 
 
 Hale School Act (1876) of the Parliament of Western Australia
 The Hale School Museum and Archives
 The former Havelock Street campus, now the Constitutional Centre
 The Association of Independent Schools of Western Australia
 Old Haleians website

 
1858 establishments in Australia